"The Sound of Missing You" is the debut single by Belgian-Tunisian singer Ameerah. It is considered to be her first international hit dance single. It was also her first song to be produced in the United States. The song reached number 3 on the Billboard Hot Dance Airplay chart.

The single was released in December 2009 in Belgium and the Netherlands as Wildboyz featuring Ameerah, charting in both countries. In October 2010, the song peaked at number-two on the Romanian Airplay Chart.

Live performance 
Ameerah performed "The Sound of Missing You" live on several tour dates throughout Europe and in certain music festivals, such as Bydgoszcz Hit Festival and the Hity na Czasie contest from Poland and the SLAM FM Beachbreak, in Bloemendaal.

Chart performance 
The song peaked at number-three on the US Billboard Hot Dance Airplay chart in early 2010, and stayed in the top 10 for more than 10 weeks. Later, in May, "The Sound of Missing You" entered the official Romanian Top 100. In mid-September, the song reached the Romanian top 10. A few weeks later, on October 17, it peaked at number-two on the Airplay Top 100, and remained at its peak position for three weeks. It was the 22nd most played song in Romania in 2010.

Music video 
The music video was shot in the United States in late 2009 and premiered on Spinnin' Records' official YouTube profile on December 3, 2009. It features Ameerah walking down the empty streets of a big city, in a desert and nearby a crashed plane. So far, it has gained over 20 million views on YouTube.

Wildboyz version
For the European markets, the song was marketed as Wildboyz featuring Ameerah. The single was a hit in Belgium, the Netherlands and Romania.

Track listing
"The Sound of Missing You" (Radio Edit) (3:33)	
"The Sound of Missing You" (Extended Mix) (5:42)	
"The Sound of Missing You" (TJ's Candlelight Mix) (3:35)

Charts 
Ameerah version (solo)

Wildboyz featuring Ameerah

References 

2009 songs
2009 debut singles
2010 singles
Ameerah (singer) songs
Songs written by Sebastian Thott
Eurodance songs
Universal Music Group singles
Spinnin' Records singles
Songs written by Didrik Thott
Songs written by Ameerah (singer)